John Shaft Covington (born April 22, 1972) is a former American football safety. He played one season in the National Football League (NFL) for the Indianapolis Colts. Covington played college football at Notre Dame.

References 

1972 births
Living people
Sportspeople from Winter Haven, Florida
Players of American football from Florida
American football safeties
Notre Dame Fighting Irish football players
Indianapolis Colts players
New Orleans Saints players